The 1999 season was the San Francisco 49ers' 50th in the National Football League (NFL) and their 54th overall. This was also Steve Young's last season in the league as he was forced to retire due to concussions.

San Francisco started the season with a 3–1 record and were heavily favored to win the Super Bowl but Young suffered his season- and career-ending concussion against the Arizona Cardinals in Week 3. After defeating the Cardinals and the Tennessee Titans without Young, the 49ers went on to lose 10 of the remaining 11 games of the season. It was the first time the team had missed the postseason since 1991, their second time missing the postseason in 17 seasons, and their first losing season (excluding the strike shortened 1982 season) since 1980. It was also their first season with fewer than 10 wins (excluding the strike shortened 1982 season) since 1980.

Statistics site Football Outsiders calculates that the 1999 49ers had the second-worst pass defense they had ever tracked.

Offseason

NFL Draft

Personnel

Staff
Head Coach - Steve Mariucci

Roster

Regular season

Schedule

Standings

References

External links
 1999 49ers on Pro Football Reference
 49ers Schedule on jt-sw.com

San Francisco 49ers
San Francisco 49ers seasons
1999 in San Francisco
San